Tom Silva, born January 17, 1947, is a contractor notable for his long-running participation in the PBS show This Old House and Ask This Old House.  He is co-owner of Silva Brothers' Construction, based in Lexington, Massachusetts.

Biography

Silva began construction at an early age, helping his father and brothers build a fallout shelter under their 1787 Colonial family house in Lexington, Massachusetts. Silva Brothers' Construction  built the first set for The Victory Garden and later were noticed by the producer of This Old House, Russell Morash, while they were working on a home. Morash invited them to become the permanent contractors for the show in 1988.

Silva also contributes to This Old House Magazine and other publications from This Old House ventures.

He has been married to his wife, Susan Silva, for over 30 years. They have two children.

The partners of Silva Brothers Construction are Tom and his nephew, Charles. Their work has been featured on numerous This Old House projects.

References

External links
 

Living people
American television personalities
People from Lexington, Massachusetts
This Old House
1947 births